José Fernando "Chepe" Escobar (born 20 December 1954, in Manizales, Colombia) was a Colombian mathematician known for his work on differential geometry and partial differential equations. He was professor at Cornell University.

He completed his mathematical undergraduate program at Universidad del Valle, Colombia. He received a scholarship that permitted him to do a master in science studies in the Institute of Pure and Applied Mathematics (IMPA) in Rio de Janeiro, Brazil.

Escobar obtained his Ph.D. from the University of California, Berkeley in 1986, under the supervision of Richard Schoen. In his thesis he solved the problem known as "the boundary Yamabe problem", that had been previously settled only for the case of manifolds without boundary.

He died from cancer on 3 January 2004, at the age 49.

Among the awards he received for his work were "the Alfred Sloan Fellowship" and "the Presidential Faculty Fellowship" (received at the White House directly from the hands of the President of the United States).

Mathematician Fernando Codá Marques was a student of him.

Selected publications

Research articles
"The Yamabe problem on manifolds with boundary", Journal of Differential Geometry, 1992.
"Conformal deformation of a Riemannian metric to a scalar flat metric with constant mean curvature on the boundary", Annals of Mathematics, 1992.
"Conformal metrics with prescribed scalar curvature", Inventiones mathematicae, 1986.
"Sharp constant in a Sobolev trace inequality", Indiana University Mathematics Journal, 1988.
"Uniqueness theorems on conformal deformation of metrics, Sobolev inequalities, and an eigenvalue estimate", Communications on Pure and Applied Mathematics, 1990.

Books
Topics in PDEs̕ and differential geometry, 2002
Some variational problems in geometry, 2000

References

1954 births
2004 deaths
People from Caldas Department
University of Valle alumni
Cornell University faculty
University of California, Berkeley alumni
21st-century Colombian mathematicians
Differential geometers
People from Manizales
Deaths from cancer in Colombia
Sloan Research Fellows
20th-century Colombian mathematicians